Blanche Fury is a 1948 British Technicolor drama film directed by Marc Allégret and starring Valerie Hobson, Stewart Granger and Michael Gough. It was adapted from a 1939 novel of the same title by Joseph Shearing. In Victorian era England, two schemers will stop at nothing to acquire the Fury estate, even murder.

Plot
The plot is based on an actual homicide case from Victorian England. Blanche Fury (Valerie Hobson) is a beautiful and genteel woman, forced into menial domestic service after the death of her parents. After a succession of failed positions, she receives an invitation to become governess for Lavinia, granddaughter of her rich uncle Simon, whom she has never previously met due to an unspecified dispute between him and her father.

On arriving at the impressive country estate, she first encounters Philip Thorn (Stewart Granger), whom she mistakes for her cousin Laurence. In fact, he is the illegitimate and only son of the former owner of the estate, Adam Fury. Thorn tells her the legend of the founder of the Fury family, killed in battle, his body defended by the ghost of his pet Barbary ape. The ape of the Furies is said to protect the family and wreak vengeance on anyone who crosses them.

Desiring position and security she marries her weak and insipid cousin Laurence. Dissatisfied with the marriage, she and Thorn begin a love affair. They conceive a plan for him to murder her husband and uncle, leaving evidence to blame local gypsies, whom her uncle had antagonised in the past.

After the inquest Thorn becomes increasingly possessive, and she fears he will murder Lavinia, heir to the estate and final obstacle to his ambition, by encouraging the child to make a lethal jump with her pony. Blanche intervenes, and, fearing for the child's life, goes to the police, implicating Thorn in the murder. She confesses to their love in court, and he is executed for the double murder. As the day of his execution arrives, Lavinia goes out alone to try the jump she'd been denied, and is killed.

Months later, Blanche gives birth to a son, whom she names Philip Fury, after his father, Thorn. She dies, leaving her infant son, a true-blooded Fury, as sole heir to the estate. So the curse of the Furys is fulfilled.

Cast
 Valerie Hobson as Blanche Fury
 Stewart Granger as Philip Thorn
 Michael Gough as Laurence Fury
 Walter Fitzgerald as Simon Fury
 Susanne Gibbs as Lavinia (as Suzanne Gibbs)
 Maurice Denham as Major Fraser
 Sybille Binder as Louisa (as Sybilla Binder)
 Ernest Jay as Calamy
 Allan Jeayes as Mr. Weatherby
 Edward Lexy as Colonel Jenkins
 Arthur Wontner as Lord Rudford
 Amy Veness as Mrs. Winterbourne
 George Woodbridge as Aimes

Original novel
The original novel was published in 1939. Cineguild bought the film rights before the book had even been written.

Real-life inspiration 
In 1848, Isaac Jermy, and his son, Isaac Jermy Jermy, were shot and killed on the porch and in the hallway, respectively, of their mansion, Stanfield Hall, Norwich, by James Blomfield Rush, a tenant farmer of theirs. Rush had been their tenant for nearly a decade, and he had mortgaged and remortgaged his farm to raise money for improvements (so he said), but without improving the farm's output. The deadline to pay off the mortgages was approaching; otherwise foreclosure and eviction would follow (adversely affecting both his children and his pregnant mistress, their governess Emily Sandford).

The Jermys had problems with the title to their estate, with relatives who claimed it was theirs. However, Isaac Jermy was the Recorder of Norwich, a prominent local man with legal connections, and it was therefore unlikely that he would lose the property. Rush's plan was to kill both Jermys, their servant, and the younger Jermy's pregnant wife while disguised, and blame the massacre on the rival claimants to the estate.

Rush planned that Emily Sandford would provide an alibi, by stating that he was at the farm during the hour or so that the crime was committed. Rush wore a false wig and whiskers, but failed to hide his body sufficiently so that the wounded Mrs Jermy and the servant Elizabeth Chestney survived to identify him. Emily Sandford refused to support his alibi. Tried in 1849, Rush defended himself (badly) and was convicted. He was subsequently hanged.

Production
Star Valerie Hobson was married to producer Anthony Havelock-Allan. She later recalled "I had just had our son, who was born mentally handicapped, and he meant the film as a sort of 'loving gift', making me back into a leading lady, which was a wonderful idea. The film didn't work completely."

The film was announced in September 1946. (Shortly afterwards 20th Century Fox announced they would make a film from another Shearing novel, Moss Rose.) Stewart Granger, then one of the biggest stars in British films, signed to co-star and Marc Allégret was to direct.

Shooting
Filming started in January 1947 at Pinewood Studios.

The courtroom scenes were filmed in the Shire Hall at Stafford. The location scenes for the film were shot at Wootton Lodge (which stood in for the Clare Hall of the story), a magnificent three-storey Georgian mansion at Upper Ellastone on the Derbyshire–Staffordshire border and on the surrounding Weaver Hills, as well as on Dunstable Downs, Bedfordshire.

Granger later said the film "was a silly story, too grim and melodramatic, but it's a wonderful looking film... I enjoyed working with Valerie Hobson, but the film didn't work."

Havelock-Allan later said he felt the most exciting aspect of the story was the murder being committed by a "gypsy woman" who was actually a man. However, he says: "Stewart Granger refused to play it dressed as a woman, even though you would only have seen a flash of him, so it lost that high point scene."

This film marks the first film appearance of Gough, probably best known for portraying Batman's butler Alfred Pennyworth in Batman, Batman Returns, Batman Forever and Batman & Robin. The stately home used in the exterior shots is Wootton Lodge in Staffordshire.

Reception
Trade papers called the film a "notable box office attraction" in British cinemas in 1948. By the end of 1949, it managed to earn £200,500 in box office rentals in the British Isles. However, it was not enough to recoup the film's cost and it recorded a loss of £135,400 (equivalent to £ in ).

Havelock-Allan later acknowledged the film was a disappointment:We took far too long over Blanche Fury, it cost too much money and it didn't 'work' and never attracted any great audience. David and Ronnie didn't like what I was trying to do with Blanche Fury, which was along the lines of the very successful costume films from Gainsborough. I wanted to make a serious one with a better story and I thought it would make a lot of money. I found out what I was making was a 'hard' film, not a 'soft' film which the others were. There was a real hatred in it as well as love, and the public didn't want it. Cineguild more or less broke up over that.

References

External links

1940s mystery drama films
1948 films
British drama films
British mystery drama films
Films directed by Marc Allégret
Films shot at Pinewood Studios
Films set in England
Films produced by Anthony Havelock-Allan
Films scored by Clifton Parker
1940s historical films
British historical films
Films set in the 19th century
Films based on British novels
1948 drama films
1940s British films